South Alamo is a census-designated place (CDP) in Hidalgo County, Texas. The area is known locally as "Little Mex (Mexico)". The population was 3,361 at the 2010 United States Census. It is part of the McAllen–Edinburg–Mission Metropolitan Statistical Area.

Geography
South Alamo is located at  (26.150741, -98.111956).

Demographics
As of the census of 2000, there were 3,101 people, 649 households, and 608 families residing in the CDP. The population density was 1,536.2 people per square mile (592.7/km2). There were 703 housing units at an average density of 348.3/sq mi (134.4/km2). The racial makeup of the CDP was 97.07% White, 0.19% African American, 0.29% Asian, 1.68% from other races, and 0.77% from two or more races. Hispanic or Latino of any race were 98.39% of the population.

There were 649 households, out of which 70.6% had children under the age of 18 living with them, 76.6% were married couples living together, 12.3% had a female householder with no husband present, and 6.2% were non-families. 4.8% of all households were made up of individuals, and 1.8% had someone living alone who was 65 years of age or older. The average household size was 4.78 and the average family size was 4.92.

In the CDP, the population was spread out, with 45.6% under the age of 18, 11.6% from 18 to 24, 28.5% from 25 to 44, 10.9% from 45 to 64, and 3.3% who were 65 years of age or older. The median age was 20 years. For every 100 females, there were 104.1 males. For every 100 females age 18 and over, there were 103.9 males.

The median income for a household in the CDP was $13,906, and the median income for a family was $14,598. Males had a median income of $14,944 versus $11,094 for females. The per capita income for the CDP was $3,162. About 66.2% of families and 69.2% of the population were below the poverty line, including 76.7% of those under age 18 and 75.9% of those age 65 or over. It is the poorest place in the United States with a population of over 1,000, and the 15th poorest overall.

Education 
South Alamo is in the Donna Independent School District.

In addition, South Texas Independent School District operates magnet schools that serve the community.

References

Census-designated places in Hidalgo County, Texas
Census-designated places in Texas